Outsider is the sixth studio album by Canadian rock band Three Days Grace. It was released on March 9, 2018 through RCA Records. The album was produced by two of the band's prior producers, Gavin Brown and Howard Benson but also by members of the band themselves. It is the second album to feature Matt Walst as lead vocalist.

The album was preceded by the release of its first single, "The Mountain".

Background and recording 
Once the tour for their 2015 album Human concluded, the band decided to take time off to work on the next album "in as much isolation as possible," according to drummer Neil Sanderson. The band desired, Sanderson explained, to "get a break and find the space to create." To accomplish this, the group spent a year writing at rural properties owned by Sanderson and bassist Brad Walst. The first song they wrote was the album's lead single, "The Mountain". According to Brad Walst, the group wrote and recorded around 20 songs, selecting the album tracks by "vibe" in order for the album to have "a good sequence to it."

Talking about the themes found on the album, Sanderson said "I think there's a common thread that talks about how to navigate your way through modern life and being bombarded by information and feelings and beliefs. We don't have all the answers here, but we definitely do bring up the topic a lot." He also revealed that lead vocalist Matt Walst was much more involved in the songwriting, messages, and concepts than on Human, which was Matt's first since joining the band in 2013. Brad Walst also stated that the album is about "the journey to find your place." The background electronic aspects of the album were influenced by Bring Me the Horizon's 2015 album That's the Spirit.

The band embarked on a headlining tour called, "The Outsider Tour" in 2018. The group also supported Avenged Sevenfold and Prophets of Rage on the "End of the World Tour" that same year.

Singles 
The band released the first single with two promotional tracks to back the album's release. "The Mountain" was released as the first single on January 25, 2018 and was accompanied by a music video. This single was followed by the album's title track, "I Am an Outsider", on February 16, 2018. "Right Left Wrong" was released as the third and final song to promote the album on March 2, 2018. On June 12, "Infra-Red" was released as the band's second single from the album. On November 13, 2018, the band released the album's opening track, "Right Left Wrong", as the third single for radio airplay.

Critical reception 

Outsider was met with mixed reviews. Kate Drexel of Music Existence gave a positive review, ending it by saying that it is what fans truly hope to hear, and giving it 5/5. Distorted Sound magazine gave 8/10 by saying that for the first time in twelve years, they deserve to be a band worth listening to, and that "Canada's resident underdogs returned". Salute magazine in a less positive review gave the album a 3/5 but it also said that it is a solid effort with some honest, unhindered, and unhinged music. The album sold 17,000 copies in the US in its first week.

Awards 
The band won the Rock Songwriters of the Year award for "The Mountain" on the 30th anniversary of the SOCAN Awards and Rock Artist of the Year on 2019 iHeartRadio Music Awards. Outsider was nominated for Album of the Year and Rock Album of the Year at the 2019 Juno Awards.

Track listing
All tracks are written by Three Days Grace (Neil Sanderson, Barry Stock, Brad Walst and Matt Walst) and producer Gavin Brown, with additional writers as listed below.

Personnel
Three Days Grace
 Matt Walst – lead vocals, rhythm guitar
 Barry Stock – lead guitar
 Brad Walst – bass guitar
 Neil Sanderson – drums, backing vocals

Additional musicians
 Rhys Fulber – additional programming

Production
 Gavin Brown – producer
 Howard Benson – producer
 Three Days Grace – producer
 Mike Plotnikoff – engineer 
 Chris Lord-Alge – mixing
 Ted Jensen – mastering at Sterling Sound, New York City
 Jill Zimmermann - engineer 
 Darren Magierowski - engineer 
 Paul Decarli - editing

Charts

References 

Three Days Grace albums
2018 albums